The Challenge (originally known as Road Rules: All Stars, followed by Real World/Road Rules Challenge) is a reality competition show on MTV that is spun off from two of the network's reality shows, The Real World and Road Rules. Originally featuring alumni from these two shows, casting for The Challenge has slowly expanded to include contestants who debuted on The Challenge itself, alumni from other MTV franchises including Are You the One?, Ex on the Beach (Brazil, UK and US), Geordie Shore and from other non-MTV shows. The contestants compete against one another in various extreme challenges to avoid elimination. The winners of the final challenge win the competition and typically share a large cash prize. The Challenge is currently hosted by T. J. Lavin.

The series premiered on June 1, 1998. The show was originally titled Road Rules: All Stars, and had notable Real World alumni participated in a Road Rules style road-trip. It was renamed Real World/Road Rules Challenge for the 2nd season, then later abridged to simply The Challenge by the show's 19th season. Since the fourth season, each season has supplied the show with a unique subtitle, such as Rivals. Each season consists of a format and theme from which the subtitle is derived.

In June 2022, MTV renewed the series through season 39.

Structure

Overview
The Challenge casts are season specific as the cast varies from season to season. The casts are made up of contestants originating from one of The Challenge's related TV programs and, in a few seasons, previously unknown contestants. The cast usually contains both "veterans" (or vets) and "rookies". Veterans are thought of as players that have won at least one Challenge season or have appeared on several seasons of the show; Rookies refer to newer players. Many recent alumni come from various reality shows such as Big Brother, Survivor, Are You the One? The Amazing Race, Ex on the Beach, Love Island ,Love Island UK , and Geordie Shore.

A season's typical multitude of cast members are usually divided up into separate teams or pairs according to a certain criteria, which varies from season to season. The criteria that teams have been arranged by over the show's history have ranged from gender, the contestants' original show, heroic/villainous status, rivals, ride or dies, countries, family and ex-romantic partners of contestants. Each of the opposing teams compete in numerous missions in order to win prizes and advance in the overall game. Following each mission, a team or a cast member is voted into an elimination round to take on the least successful team from the previous mission, or the winning team gets to choose a team for elimination to face off against another team determined by different circumstances. In elimination rounds, they must compete against one another to determine which one is eliminated from the season. Each season has its own, very distinct elimination round, distinguished from those of other seasons in title, design, and general atmosphere. Determining which two teams or two cast members are sent into the episode's elimination round frequently leads to drama and dirty gameplay; this is due to the show's contestants being in charge of who is thrown into elimination rounds. Like that of The Real World, sporadically throughout the course of each episode, various contestants are seen privately expressing themselves through reality TV confessionals about the events taking place on the show.

Some seasons, however, have used entirely different formats from the typical: The Island is one Challenge in particular that adopted many features atypical to Real World/Road Rules Challenge, instead taking concepts like that of another reality television game show Survivor; as another example, the first season (Road Rules: All Stars) ironically only included contestants from The Real World and consisted of a much smaller cast before the show was completely restructured in its second season. Except for season one, a monetary prize has always been the award for winning the final mission.

Hosts
The series initially used no hosts but instead a former cast member who had been kicked off his or her season, providing assignments as "Mr." or "Ms. Big" (David "Puck" Rainey, David Edwards, and Gladys Sanabria served this role). After one season without anyone in this role, the series began using hosts: Eric Nies and Mark Long co-hosted a season, and Jonny Moseley and Dave Mirra hosted various seasons before T. J. Lavin became the show's regular host by the 11th season.

History

Over time there was a playful rivalry with the cast of the Road Rules occasionally trying to prank The Real World cast that was currently in production. During the filming of The Real World: Boston and Road Rules: Islands, the two casts met while the Real World cast was vacationing in San Juan, Puerto Rico. Producers set up a face-off where both teams would compete for a cash prize. The challenge brought in high ratings and this set ideas in motion to produce yet another spin-off series.  After another face-off called AquaGames, hosted by Kit Hoover and Mark Long, between The Real World: Seattle and Road Rules: Down Under in 1998, the Challenge series was born in 1998 with Road Rules: All Stars, and featured cast members from five seasons of The Real World.

After All Stars, producers decided to include former cast members of Road Rules in the series as well. In the next season, two six-member teams were sent around the world in a competition to see which show could best the other in head-to-head competition. The series followed the format for three years and brought in hugely successful ratings.

Following the hugely successful boom of reality television in the new millennium, from shows like Survivor, producers decided to add new elements to the series. 2002's Battle of the Seasons was the first season to depart from the previous six-member structure and brought in a large group of former cast members to compete in one location. The show added in eliminations that added an additional layer of scheming and manipulation. Earlier season incorporated voting off by majority, but eventually that changed to sudden-death elimination competitions between cast members up for elimination. With this season MTV also added a fantasy challenge game to their website. Players "draft" cast members, a la fantasy baseball and cast members are given points for performing certain tasks, such as cursing or "hooking up."

After switching to the "vote off" format, the series would alternate between "Battle" seasons, including two seasons of Battle of the Sexes and themed Challenges which included the Gauntlet and Inferno seasons. Both the Gauntlet and Inferno seasons contained "showdown" matches between members of the two opposing teams. The cast member who lost the showdown would be sent home. The Gauntlet seasons featured an intra-cast dynamic as teams were forced to vote off cast members within their own groups into the showdown, while the Inferno seasons featured an inter-cast dynamic as teams were forced to vote off cast members from the other group into the showdown.

Cast members

Contestants are various reality television cast members from different television shows. Originally the cast consisted of The Real World and Road Rules alumni, and cast who debuted directly on The Challenge, but eventually MTV expanded it to other alumni from other reality shows.

Seasons

Spin offs

The Challenge: Champs vs. Stars

The Challenge: Champs vs. Stars (originally known as The Challenge: Champs vs. Pros) is a special recurring mini-series of The Challenge. In each multi-week event, alumni from  The Challenge compete against celebrities to win money for charity.

The Challenge: All Stars

In 2020, Road Rules: USA – The First Adventure alumnus Mark Long started asking his social media followers if they'd be interested in seeing former cast members of The Challenge coming together for a new version of the series. The movement was titled "We Want OGs". After his idea went viral, he announced a partnership with Bunim/Murray Productions to further develop his project and began gauging interest from potential former cast members. On February 24, 2021, the show was officially announced as The Challenge: All Stars.

The Challenge: World Championship
In February 2022, a new series of international seasons series was announced to air later in the year. The series will comprise four new editions of The Challenge – three new international versions for Australia, Argentina, the UK, as well as a new American edition which aired on CBS with CBS reality show alumni called The Challenge: USA. All editions of the series will air locally on a Paramount affiliated network and be available globally to stream on Paramount+. This will follow with a fifth season in which winners will compete again on another season titled  The Challenge: World Championship which will air on Paramount+. When the series was first announced, they were using the name The Challenge: War of the Worlds.
Versions

Specials

Spring Break Challenge

In March 2010, prior to the airing of the 19th season, MTV aired a special spring break spin-off of The Challenge in Acapulco, Mexico. Challenge alum coached teams of college-aged friends in various challenges of old and new, while Fresh Meat alumnus Evan Starkman and The Real World: Key West alumna Paula Meronek served as broadcasters, with T. J. Lavin as the host. Camila Nakagawa, a contestant of the winning team, went on to appear on future challenges, with her debut Challenge being Cutthroat. To date, Camila is the only player to appear on the challenges.

The Challenge: CT's Getting Married
The Challenge: CT's Getting Married is a two-part special revolving around the wedding of Challenge star Chris "CT" Tamburello and Lilianet Solares. MTV released the trailer and premiere date on November 20, 2018. The two-week special premiered on December 11, 2018, and concluded on December 18, 2018.

The Challenge: Untold History
The Challenge: Untold History is a six-part documentary about The Challenge. It will feature over 30 former competitors and several celebrity fans, discussing the show and telling behind the scenes stories. It premiered on Wednesday, September 21, 2022 on MTV. A sneak preview was shown during the Unscripted portion of the 2022 MTV Movie & TV Awards.

References

External links
 MTV's Official The Challenge website
 MTV.ca's Official The Challenge website
 TV.com series reference page 
 TVGuide.com series reference page

 
Television series by Bunim/Murray Productions
1990s American reality television series
1990s American game shows
1998 American television series debuts
2000s American reality television series
2000s American game shows
2010s American reality television series
2010s American game shows
2020s American reality television series
2020s American game shows
MTV original programming
English-language television shows
Reality competition television series
Television shows set in Africa
Television shows set in Asia
Television shows set in Europe
Television shows set in North America
Television shows set in Oceania
Television shows set in South America